Diwan and divan are variant terms originally used in Persian, Arabic, and Turkish with derivates in other Asian and European languages such as diwaan, dewan, etc. (see etymology sections at Divan, Diwan (poetry) and Dewan). These terms may refer to:

Arts and entertainment
Diwan (poetry), a collection of Persian, Arabic, Turkish, or Urdu poetry
Diwan (Nasir Khusraw) by Nasir Khusraw
Diwan-e Shams-e Tabrizi by Rumi
West-östlicher Divan by Goethe
Diwân, a 1998 album by Rachid Taha
Diwan 2, a 2006 album by Rachid Taha
Diwan (film), a 2003 Indian Tamil-language film
Diwan, a character in the anime series Skyland
West-Eastern Divan Orchestra, a Middle Eastern music ensemble founded by Daniel Barenboim and Edward Said

Buildings
Diwan-khane, guest house of the tribal chieftain in the tribal Middle Eastern, Arab, Persian, or Kurdish society
Divan (Mughal architecture), a type of audience hall in Mughal palaces
Diwaniya, a formal sitting room in Gulf Arab households

Education
Diwan (school), a federation of schools teaching in Breton language in Brittany (diwan means seed in Breton)
Diwan College of Management, former name of Taiwan Shoufu University

Government and politics
Divan or Diwan, a high governmental body in many Islamic states
Divan-ı Hümayun, the government council of the Ottoman Empire
ad hoc Divans, legislative and consultative assemblies of the Danubian Principalities (Moldavia and Wallachia), vassals of the Ottoman Empire
Diwan, a code of laws first introduced by Sharif ul-Hāshim of Sulu
The Girgam or Diwan, the royal chronicle of the Kanem-Bornu Empire, written in Arabic

People
Dewan Farid Gazi, former leader of Habiganj-1
Dewan Mohammad Azraf, National Professor of Bangladesh
Hamza Dewan Choudhury, midfielder for English football club Leicester City F.C.
Muneeb Diwan (born 1972), Canadian cricket player

Places
 Diwan, Queensland, a locality in the Shire of Douglas, Australia

Titles
Diwan (title) (dewan or divan), a number of Middle Eastern titles used in various languages for high officials, especially of cabinet rank, or as a rank of high nobility in South Asia
List of Diwans of Mysore
Diwan of Hyderabad
Dewan Bahadur, a title of honor awarded during British Raj

Other uses
Divan (furniture), a kind of couch
Box-spring or divan bed, in UK usage
Divan, a traditional festival of the Bunjevci people in Hungary 
Chicken Divan, a type of casserole
Diwan, or religious scroll containing Mandaean scriptures

See also
Dewan, a title
Diwana (disambiguation)
Diwani, a calligraphic variety of the Arabic script

Persian words and phrases
Bengali words and phrases